Nikos Kosis is a Greek Cypriot politician who served as, Minister of the Interior and Defense, Minister of Justice and Public Order and as a Member of Parliament in the Nicosia District.

Personal life
Kosis was born in the Nicosia District of Cyprus in the village of Dali on 20 May 1933. He is fluent in both the Greek and English languages and was the publisher of the newspaper "O agon". He has three children and is married to Louiza Kosi.

Political career
He was first elected as a member of parliament in the country's first parliamentary elections in 1960 as a member of parliament for the Nicosia District under the Patriotic Front. He was re-voted in the 1970 parliamentary elections under the Eniaion party.

On August 29, 1974, he was placed as Minister of the Interior and Defense and remained in that position until January 14, 1975.

On the 9th of April 1997, he was made Minister of Justice and Public order and remained in that position until September 24, 2002.

References

Greek political people
Greek government officials
Greek politicians
1933 births
Living people
People from Nicosia District